The 2020–21 Men's Hoofdklasse Hockey, also known as the Tulp Hoofdklasse Men for sponsorship reasons, was the 48th season of the Men's Hoofdklasse Hockey, the top Dutch field hockey league. The season began on 6 September 2020 and was suspended for at least four weeks on 13 October 2020 due to the COVID-19 pandemic in the Netherlands.  The season resumed on 31 January 2021. It concluded with the third match of the championship final on 16 May 2021. On 23 April 2021 it was announced that the relegation play-offs would not be played because the second division's season could not be finished due to the pandemic.

The defending champions Bloemendaal won their 21st title by defeating Kampong 2–0 in the final best of three series.

Teams

Accommodation and locations

Personnel and kits

Number of teams by province

Regular season

League table

Results

Top goalscorers

Play-offs
The play-offs started on 5 May 2021 with the semi-finals. All rounds are played in a best of three format, with the higher seeded team playing the second and third game at home.

Bracket

Semi-finals

Bloemendaal won series 2–0.

Kampong won series 2–0.

Final

Bloemendaal won series 2–0 and won their 21st national title.

References

Men's Hoofdklasse Hockey
Hoofdklasse
Hoofdklasse Hockey Men
Hoofdklasse Hockey Men
Hoofdklasse Hockey